Karl Henlein (25 April 1892 – 2 May 1960) was an Austrian football manager and former player.

Club career
Born in Austrian capital Vienna, Heinlein played with Wiener AC (also known as WAC) in the Austrian First Class since its first edition in season 1911–12 till the winter break of the 1918–19 season. Next, he moved to Yugoslavia where he became player/manager of HŠK Građanski Zagreb and has won two titles of the Zagreb Subassociation first League.  In the winter-break of the 1921–22 season he returned to Austria and played three more seasons with First Vienna FC in Austrian top-flight.

International career
Karl Heinlein made 2 appearances for the Austria national football team, one in 1917 and another in 1919.

Coaching career
Karl Heinlein started his coaching career while he was still a player, by coaching HŠK Građanski Zagreb at same time he played there. Later he coached Spanish side CE Europa in the 1929 La Liga and later Swiss side FC Luzern in the season 1934–35.

References

1892 births
1960 deaths
Footballers from Vienna
Austrian footballers
Austria international footballers
Association football midfielders
Wiener AC players
First Vienna FC players
HŠK Građanski Zagreb players
Expatriate footballers in Yugoslavia
Austrian football managers
Eintracht Frankfurt players
HŠK Građanski Zagreb managers
Expatriate football managers in Yugoslavia
CE Europa managers
La Liga managers
Expatriate football managers in Spain
FC Luzern managers
Expatriate football managers in Switzerland
Austrian expatriate sportspeople in Spain
Austrian expatriate sportspeople in Switzerland
Austrian expatriate sportspeople in Yugoslavia